Aaron ben Jacob ha-Kohen was a Provençal rabbi, one of a family of scholars living at Narbonne, France (not Lunel, as David Conforte and others say), and who suffered from the expulsion of the Jews in 1306.

He emigrated to Majorca, and there, some time before 1327, composed a ritual work of great merit bearing the title Orchot Hayyim (The Paths of Life). The first part deals chiefly with the laws concerning the daily prayers, the Sabbath, and the festivals, and was published in Florence in 1752. The work is a compilation of Talmudic laws and discussions rather than an original system, and was conceived on a plan similar to Jacob ben Asher's great code, the Arba'ah Turim, which appeared soon afterward and superseded it as a ritual guide on account of its more practical character. The Orchot Hayyim, however, contains some ethical and doctrinal chapters which are not found in the Arba'ah Turim. Aaron ha-Kohen was especially fond of mystic lore and of rabbinical discussion. A less strict legalist than Jacob ben Asher, Aaron's Orchot Hayyim is of greater value to the student of literature than to one who seeks practical decisions.

A different work, the Kol Bo, is considered by some to be an abridgement of Orchot Hayyim (written by another author or by Aaron ben Jacob himself); according to others, Kol Bo is a first draft of Orchot Hayyim.<ref>Al Harishonim veAl HaAchronim" (Machon Tzurba deRabanan), 4th edition</ref>

See also
 Hachmei Provence

External links
 Kohanim Greats: Rabbi Ahron HaKohen of Luniel at Kehuna.org

References

 Its bibliography:
Henri Gross, "Aaron ha-Kohen und sein Ritualwerk Orḥot Ḥayyim," in Monatsschrift, 1869, pp. 433–450, 531-541
 idem, Gallia Judaica, pp. 290, 420;
 Heimann Joseph Michael, Or ha-Ḥayyim, No. 300; Benjacob, Oẓar ha-Sefarim,'' pp. 51, 239.

14th-century French rabbis
Provençal Jews
Clergy from Narbonne
Medieval Majorcan Jews
Jewish refugees
French Orthodox rabbis
Year of birth unknown
Year of death unknown
Kohanim writers of Rabbinic literature
Authors of books on Jewish law